John Coyle may refer to:

 John Coyle (footballer) (1932–2016), Scottish footballer
 John Coyle (speed skater) (born 1968), American short track speedskater